Temnora marginata is a moth of the family Sphingidae first described by Francis Walker in 1856. It is known from savannah and woodland in eastern and southern Africa.

The length of the forewings is 21–23 mm. The forewing outer margin is even, excavate below the apex and above the tornus and convex between. The forewing upperside ground colour is dark brown with purple overtones. The hindwings are dark orange brown, with an inconspicuous brown marginal band.

Subspecies
Temnora marginata marginata
Temnora marginata comorana Rothschild & Jordan, 1903 (Comoro Islands)

References

Temnora
Moths of the Comoros
Lepidoptera of Mozambique
Lepidoptera of Malawi
Moths of Sub-Saharan Africa
Moths described in 1856